Bernard Brodie may refer to:

Bernard Brodie (military strategist) (1910–1978), American military strategist
Bernard Beryl Brodie (1907–1989), British researcher on drug therapy